Noah Brown may refer to:

People
Noah Brown (shipwright), American shipbuilder
Noah Brown (American football) (born 1996), American football player
J. Noah Brown, president and chief executive officer of the Association of Community College Trustees

Other
SS Noah Brown, United States Liberty Ship during World War II